Laurent Geedts (Leuven, 1728 – Leuven, 1813) was a Flemish still life painter active in Leuven.  He is known for his trompe-l'œil still lifes of game birds.

Life 
Laurent Geedts was born in Leuven where he appears to have been active throughout his career.  He is the first artist in the Geedts family and was followed by a large number of painters, sculptors and engravers. His nephew Josse-Pieter Geedts was a genre, history and religious artist and Josse-Pieter’s son Pieter Paul was a portrait painter, lithographer and sculptor. The artists in the Geedts family further included Guillaume-Auguste (1802–1866) and his three sons Auguste, Hippolyte and Paul.

Laurent Geedts was the master of François Xavier Joseph Jacquin (1756–1826).

Work 

Laurent specialised in still life paintings and in particular trompe-l'œil still lifes of game.  He was active as a decorative artist whose works were designed to be displayed over a chimney or as an over-door.  He produced accurately observed depictions of birds.

His work continued the tradition of trompe-l'œil still lifes of game of the Netherlandish masters of the 17th century such as Jacob Biltius, Cornelis Biltius and Cornelis Norbertus Gysbrechts.  His illusionistic works of game birds against a plain or wooden wall use natural light and shade effects, combined with a very detailed and precise rendering of the plumage to create the trompe-l'œil effect that they appear to be real.

References

External links 

1728 births
1813 deaths
Flemish still life painters
Artists from Leuven
Trompe-l'œil artists